Shojaee or Shojaei (Persian: شجاعی) may refer to these people:
 Seyyed Mahdi Shojaee, Iranian author, novelist, journalist and screenwriter
 Malek Shojaee, Iranian philosopher
 Ali Shojaei (footballer, born 1953)
 Ali Shojaei (footballer, born 1997)
 Masoud Shojaei, Iranian footballer
 Mostafa Shojaei, Iranian footballer
 Zahra Shojaei, Iranian politician

Iranian-language surnames